Donald Dean Trull (born October 20, 1941) is a former American football quarterback in the American Football League (AFL). Trull played football collegiately at Baylor University, where he was an All-American and twice won the Sammy Baugh Trophy as the nation's top passer.

Trull finished fourth in the Heisman Trophy voting in 1963. In 2013, he was inducted into the College Football Hall of Fame.

See also
 List of American Football League players
 List of college football yearly passing leaders

References

1941 births
Living people
Sportspeople from Oklahoma City
Players of American football from Oklahoma
American football quarterbacks
Baylor Bears football players
College Football Hall of Fame inductees
Houston Oilers players
Boston Patriots players
Houston Texans (WFL) players
Shreveport Steamer players
American Football League players
American players of Canadian football
Canadian football quarterbacks
Edmonton Elks players